Riverside Park is a   Local Nature Reserve in Guildford in Surrey. It is owned by  Guildford Borough Council and the National Trust and managed by Guildford Borough Council.

This wetland site has open water and reedbeds. Breeding birds include terns, sedge warblers, reed buntings, water rails, redshanks, snipe and lapwings.

There is access from Bowers Lane.

References

Local Nature Reserves in Surrey